Chromium(III) 2-ethylhexanoate, C24H45CrO6, is a coordination complex of chromium and ethylhexanoate. In combination with 2,5-dimethylpyrrole it forms the Phillips selective ethylene trimerisation catalyst (not to be confused with Phillips catalyst), used in the industrial production of linear alpha olefins, particularly 1-hexene or 1-octene.

References

Chromium(III) compounds
Ethylhexanoates
Coordination complexes